Haedropleura summa is a species of sea snail, a marine gastropod mollusk in the family Horaiclavidae.

It was previously included within the family Turridae.

Description
The length of the shell attains 12.7 mm.

Distribution
This marine species occurs off KwaZulu-Natal, South Africa

References

 Kilburn, R.N. (1988) Turridae (Mollusca: Gastropoda) of southern Africa and Mozambique. Part 4. Subfamilies Drilliinae, Crassispirinae and Strictispirinae. Annals of the Natal Museum, 29, 167–320

External links
  Tucker, J.K. 2004 Catalog of recent and fossil turrids (Mollusca: Gastropoda). Zootaxa 682:1–1295.

Endemic fauna of South Africa
summa